The Giornale dei Ragazzi (Journal of the Teens) was a fortnightly magazine for children consisting of short stories, comics and cultural columns.

History and profile
Giornale dei Ragazzi  was created in April 1926 on the initiative of Cesare Ferri, an elementary school teacher who at the time was a popular radio host, under the name "Nonno Radio". Featuring a dutiful observance of the moral dictates of Fascism, the magazine consisted mostly of columns on various topics, and introduced the comics (of strict Italian production, in compliance with the directives of the MinCulPop) only from  the 8th number in last year of publication.

In November 1943, the magazine announced Vittorio Metz as a new director to replace Ferri, as well as a new format (rotogravure size and color pages) and a weekly cadence, but the redesign never took shape and the magazine closed after 17 years of publication.

See also

 List of magazines in Italy

Notes

1926 comics debuts
1943 comics endings
1926 establishments in Italy
1943 disestablishments in Italy
Biweekly magazines published in Italy
Defunct magazines published in Italy
Fascist newspapers and magazines
Comics magazines published in Italy
Children's magazines published in Italy
Italian-language magazines
Magazines established in 1926
Magazines disestablished in 1943
Magazines about comics
Youth magazines